Bugaia Island is an island in Lake Victoria. It belongs to Uganda.

References 

Lake islands of Uganda
Islands of Lake Victoria